The 2017 BWF International Series was the tenth season of the BWF International Series.

Schedule 
Below is the schedule released by Badminton World Federation:

Results

Winners

Performance by nation

Players with multiple titles 
In alphabetical order.

References 

BWF International Challenge
BWF International Challenge